Kanarata Point (‘Nos Kanarata’ \'nos ka-na-'ra-ta\) is the rocky point in northeastern Astrolabe Island in Bransfield Strait, Antarctica forming the north extremity of the island surmounted by Dragons Teeth. It is “named after Kanarata Peak in Rila Mountain, Bulgaria.”

Location
German-British mapping in 1996.

Maps
 Trinity Peninsula. Scale 1:250000 topographic map No. 5697. Institut für Angewandte Geodäsie and British Antarctic Survey, 1996.
 Antarctic Digital Database (ADD). Scale 1:250000 topographic map of Antarctica. Scientific Committee on Antarctic Research (SCAR). Since 1993, regularly upgraded and updated.

Notes

References
 Kanarata Point. SCAR Composite Gazetteer of Antarctica.
 Bulgarian Antarctic Gazetteer. Antarctic Place-names Commission. (details in Bulgarian, basic data in English)

External links
 Kanarata Point. Copernix satellite image

Headlands of Trinity Peninsula
Astrolabe Island
Bulgaria and the Antarctic